Jin Hyuk is a South Korean television director. He directed Brilliant Legacy (2009), City Hunter (2011), Prosecutor Princess (2010), Master's Sun (2013), Doctor Stranger (2014), and The Legend of the Blue Sea (2016).

Career
Jin Hyuk graduated from Yonsei University in 2001 with a degree in Business Administration, then joined the TV network Seoul Broadcasting System (SBS). He first worked as a producer, became an assistant director from 2003 to 2007, then a second unit director in 2008.

In 2009, Jin directed his first television drama, Brilliant Legacy (also known as Shining Inheritance). A Cinderella-esque story about a poor, kind-hearted girl who becomes the sole heiress of a rich, elderly woman who wants to teach her spoiled family a lesson, Brilliant Legacy became an unexpected hit, reaching a peak viewership rating of 47.1%, and catapulted its relatively unknown stars Han Hyo-joo and Lee Seung-gi to fame. Jin won Best Drama PD at the 17th Korean Culture and Entertainment Awards, and was nominated for Best New Television Director at the 46th Baeksang Arts Awards.

He and Brilliant Legacy screenwriter So Hyun-kyung collaborated again for Prosecutor Princess (2010), a romantic comedy/legal drama in which a vain and shallow law graduate is forced to work as a public prosecutor which gradually changes her outlook on the world. City Hunter followed in 2011, which Jin considered a prequel of the same-titled manga by Tsukasa Hojo, transforming its protagonist into a Blue House IT expert by day, and a vengeful, justice-seeking vigilante by night. Despite middling domestic ratings for both series, Kim So-yeon (previously typecast in dramatic roles) drew praise for her comic acting in Prosecutor Princess, while her co-star Park Si-hoo and City Hunter lead actor Lee Min-ho increased their overseas fanbase due to their respective series. Jin received a Best Production Director nomination at the 4th Korea Drama Awards for City Hunter.

He then worked with the Hong sisters for Master's Sun (2013), a horror/romantic comedy starring So Ji-sub and Gong Hyo-jin about a selfish shopping mall CEO who finds himself falling for a woman who can communicate with ghosts. In 2014, Jin cast Lee Jong-suk as a genius doctor who defected from North Korea then encounters the doppelgänger of his dead first love in Doctor Stranger.

Jin is set to direct FHM 2, the sequel to the 2011 Chinese television drama FHM, which revolves around the friendship, desires, and ambitions of men in their thirties. Starring Park Hae-jin, Zhang Liang and Joker Xue, FHM 2 is a joint venture between a Chinese production company and Korean conglomerate CJ E&M and will air in 2015.

Filmography

As assistant director
South of the Sun (SBS, 2003)
Queen's Conditions (SBS, 2005)
Single Life  (SBS, 2006)
Blue Fish (SBS, 2007)
Get Karl! Oh Soo-jung (SBS, 2007)
Bichunmoo (SBS, 2008)

As second unit director
On Air (SBS, 2008)
Painter of the Wind (SBS, 2008)

As director
Brilliant Legacy (SBS, 2009)
Prosecutor Princess (SBS, 2010)
City Hunter (SBS, 2011)
Master's Sun (SBS, 2013)
Doctor Stranger (SBS, 2014)
FHM 2 (2015)
The Legend of the Blue Sea (SBS, 2016)
Sisyphus: The Myth (JTBC, 2021)

References

External links
 
 

South Korean television directors
Yonsei University alumni
Living people
Year of birth missing (living people)